"Apologia Pro Poemate Meo" is a poem by Wilfred Owen. It deals with the atrocities of World War I. The title means "in defence of my poetry" and is often viewed as a rebuttal to a remark in Robert Graves' letter "for God's sake cheer up and write more optimistically - the war's not ended yet but a poet should have a spirit above wars."

Alternatively, the poem is seen as a possible response to "Apologia Pro Vita Sua".

The poem describes some of the horrors of war and how this leads to a lack of emotion and a desensitisation to death. However the key message of the poem is revealed in the final two stanzas criticizing "you" at home (contemporary readers) for using war propaganda and images as a form of entertainment "These men are worth/ Your tears: You are not worth their merriment."

The poem begins and concludes as follows:

References

Poetry by Wilfred Owen
World War I poems